Loxoptygus is a genus of African tarantulas that was first described by Eugène Louis Simon in 1903.  it contains two species, found in Ethiopia: L. coturnatus and L. ectypus. It was removed from the synonymy of Phoneyusa, and is considered a senior synonym of Loxoptygella.

See also
 List of Theraphosidae species

References

Endemic fauna of Ethiopia
Theraphosidae genera
Spiders of Africa
Theraphosidae